Craig Etherington (born 16 September 1979) is an English former footballer who played in the Football League for West Ham United, Halifax Town and Plymouth Argyle.

References

 Sourced from

External links
 

English footballers
English Football League players
West Ham United F.C. players
Halifax Town A.F.C. players
Plymouth Argyle F.C. players
1979 births
Living people
Association football midfielders